Natalia Didelka Mills Urrunaga (born 22 March 1993) is a Panamanian footballer who plays as a forward for Costa Rican club Alajuelense CODEA and the Panama women's national team.

See also
 List of Panama women's international footballers

References

External links

1993 births
Living people
Sportspeople from Panama City
Panamanian women's footballers
Women's association football forwards
Fundación Albacete players
Segunda Federación (women) players
Panama women's international footballers
Pan American Games competitors for Panama
Footballers at the 2019 Pan American Games
Central American Games bronze medalists for Panama
Central American Games medalists in football
Panamanian expatriate women's footballers
Panamanian expatriate sportspeople in Spain
Expatriate women's footballers in Spain
Panamanian expatriate sportspeople in Costa Rica
Expatriate women's footballers in Costa Rica